Alexei Simakov (born April 7, 1979) is a Russian former professional ice hockey forward. He formerly played with Avtomobilist Yekaterinburg in the KHL.

Simakov made his Kontinental Hockey League debut playing with Metallurg Magnitogorsk during the inaugural 2008–09 KHL season.

References

External links

1979 births
Living people
Ak Bars Kazan players
Avtomobilist Yekaterinburg players
HC CSKA Moscow players
Metallurg Magnitogorsk players
HC Neftekhimik Nizhnekamsk players
SKA Saint Petersburg players
Sokol Krasnoyarsk players
HC Yugra players
Russian ice hockey right wingers